Tucker Glacier is a major valley glacier of Victoria Land, about 144 km (90 mi) long, flowing southeast between Admiralty Mountains and Victory Mountains to the Ross Sea. There is a snow saddle at the glacier's head, just west of Homerun Range, from which Ebbe Glacier flows northwestward.
The Biscuit Step allows good access near its junction with Trafalgar Glacier.

Explored by NZGSAE, 1957–58, and named by them after Tucker Inlet, the ice-filled coastal indentation at the mouth of this glacier named by Captain James Clark Ross in 1841.

See also
 List of glaciers in the Antarctic
 Pemmican Step

References

Admiralty Mountains
Glaciers of Victoria Land
Borchgrevink Coast